The  San Francisco System (also known as the "Hub and Spokes" architecture) is a network of alliances pursued by the United States in the Asia-Pacific region, after the end of World War II – the United States as a "hub", and Japan, South Korea, Taiwan, the Philippines, Thailand, Australia, and New Zealand as "spokes". The system is made of bilateral political-military and economic commitments between the United States and its Asia-Pacific allies. This system stands in contrast to a multilateral alliance, such as NATO.

Initially, the United States sought to establish a multilateral alliance among its allies in the Asia-Pacific region, but the American allies in the Asia-Pacific region were unwilling or ambivalent about entering into a multilateral alliance. As a consequence, the United States opted for the Hub and Spokes architecture, a set of bilateral alliances.

History
The hub-and-spokes system, with the United States as the "hub" and no apparent connections between the "spokes" allowed the United States to exercise effective control over the smaller allies of the Asia-Pacific region. The legacy of the system continues to today, represented by the absence of the multilateral security architecture in the region like NATO. Some argue that the reason why the hub-and-spoke network remains viable today is because its focus moved from regional concerns to those of the global such as the War on Terror and issues dealing with weapons of mass destruction.

Post Korean War
Right after World War II, United States was not interested in being involved in the Asia-Pacific region and was more concentrated in its role in Europe. However after the Korean War, the United States became more engaged in the Asia-Pacific region.

Bilateral agreements of the 1950s
The United States started building its diplomatic relations in the Asia-Pacific region with the Philippines, its former territory. It moved to sign a Mutual Defense Treaty with the Philippines in August 1951. Thereafter in September 1951, the United States established the Security Treaty with Australia and New Zealand and at the San Francisco Conference, signed the Security Treaty with Japan. Following this, the Mutual Defense Treaty with the Republic of Korea was established in October 1953, as well as the Mutual Defense Treaty with the Republic of China in December 1954. Later on, the United States signed a communiqué with Thailand in March 1962. With these agreements, the United States was able to construct the hub-and-spokes system.

Victor Cha explains the reason for the United States’s choice for a bilateral structure with the powerplay theory. The underlying idea came from the domino theory – that if one nation falls into communism others will follow. He defines powerplay as 'the construction of an asymmetric alliance designed to exert maximum control over the smaller allies in the region that might engage in aggressive behavior against adversaries that could entrap the United States into an unwanted war.' In other words, the hub and spokes system allowed the United States to not only contain the threat posed by the Soviet Union but also acquire exclusive power over the Asia-Pacific region. With this system the United States would be able to control rogue allies in the form of anti-communist dictators who might start wars for reasons of domestic legitimacy of their own regime. The United States had a fear that it may be entrapped in an unwanted war, thus needed a way to contain these rogue allies. An example of a rogue ally is Syngman Rhee of South Korea. Due to his ambitions to unify the Korean peninsula, the treaty would contain his adventurism. Another is Chiang Kai-Shek. His ambition to overtake mainland China heightened the fear of entrapment to the United States. Another reason for the United States in taking bilateral agreements in the region was to assure the nations in the region against the revival of Japanese aggression and at the same time, assisting Japan for its economic recovery, in order for it to become a growth engine of the region by giving enough economic opportunity (a direct contrast to the Treaty of Versailles between the Allies of World War I and Germany, which forced Germany to compensate for the massive destruction it had caused, leading to its early collapse.)

Multilateralism
However, over the years, Asia-Pacific nations began to recognize the value of multilateralism and began forming indigenous multilateral security mechanisms, which the United States is not a member of, such as the ARF (1994), ASEAN, APEC, but these are considered to be venues for discussion of security issues without developing concrete plans for execution. The 1997 Asian financial crisis caused some regional states to realize the importance of an ‘exit/entry option’ for regional economic stability aside from the United States. This has been characterized as a challenge to the hub-and-spokes system led by the United States, as the nations in the region increased their interactions with China, making the bilateral alliances as a hedging option.  According to a 2020 study, the United States wanted a multilateral alliance in the Asia-Pacific region rather than the hub-and-spokes architecture.

Rationale
The hub-and-spokes system is a highly asymmetric alliance by nature in both security and economic dimensions, offering military protection and economic access through trade rather than aid. The system can best be explained through the lens of the security-autonomy tradeoff model. The model accounts for asymmetrical alliance ties involving states of different power status than for symmetric alliance bonds. An asymmetric alliance is a contract in which the major power takes on the responsibility for a minor country's security by pledging to support it in the contingency of military conflict. In return, the major power gains autonomy or influence over the minor power's foreign policy decision-making process.  
The rationale for the spokes to entering this system can be explained as minor powers may seeking alliances in order to increase security from military aggression. While major powers may be interested in alliances with minor powers, not to defend its own territory, but to extend their sphere of military and foreign influence.

Japan
It is important to note that the nature of the relationship was a bit different with Japan from other Asia-Pacific countries. The United States viewed Japan as a possible great power in East Asia. Thus, the United States constructed the strongest defense treaty with Japan.  The United States wanted Japan to be more involved and share the burden in peace keeping in Asia. However, the Yoshida Doctrine shows that Japan did not share the same ideas.

See also
Mutual Defense Treaty (United States–Philippines)
ANZUS
Security Treaty between the United States and Japan
Mutual Defense Treaty (United States–South Korea)
Sino-American Mutual Defense Treaty
Thanat–Rusk Communiqué

References

United States–Asian relations
Cold War alliances and military strategy